Binns Hall is an unincorporated community in eastern Charles City County, Virginia, United States. Binns Hall lies at the intersection of the Glebe Lane and Liberty Church Roads. A post office once occupied the Binns Hall Store. The community had two schools and a hall of the Order of St. Lukes.  Liberty Baptist Church continues to operate in the community.

The historic homes of Binn's Hall listed on the National Register of Historic Places include Poplar Springs, a home of the Joseph Vaiden family;, and Piney Grove at Southall's Plantation, the plantation of Furneau Southall.  Other historic homes include Meadow Springs, another Vaiden homestead; and Moss Side, built by Edmund Archer Saunders.  The Harwood family cemetery is located on the grounds of Piney Grove at Southall's Plantation.

External links 
Hall Historic Highway Marker

Unincorporated communities in Charles City County, Virginia
Unincorporated communities in Virginia